The 2013–14 Notre Dame Fighting Irish men's basketball team represented the University of Notre Dame during the 2013–14 NCAA Division I men's basketball season. The team played its home games at the Purcell Pavilion at the Joyce Center in South Bend, Indiana. This marked Notre Dame's inaugural season in the Atlantic Coast Conference, having moved from the Big East Conference. They finished the season 15–17, 6–12 in ACC play to finish in a three-way tie for 11th place. They lost in the first round of the ACC tournament Wake Forest.

Previous season
The Fighting Irish finished the 2012–13 season 25–10, with an 11–7 record in Big East play. They reached the semifinals of the Big East tournament, which was their fourth consecutive trip to that round in their final appearance before departing to the ACC. However, for a third year in a row they were eliminated by Louisville. The Irish earned a #7 seed for the NCAA tournament, where they were eliminated in the second round by Iowa State.

Senior forward Jack Cooley was named First Team All-Big East, while junior guard Jerian Grant was named Second Team All-Big East. Additionally, sophomore guard Pat Connaughton was named to the Big East Championship All-Tournament Team, the first Irish player to be so honored since Scott Martin in 2011.

Pre-season

On September 12, 2012, Notre Dame announced that they had accepted an invitation to join the ACC in all sports except for football. Discussions with both the Big East and the ACC eventually led to an agreement for the Irish to join the ACC starting with 2013-14 calendar year. Notre Dame basketball announced its first slate of conference games on April 23, 2013. As "partner schools" with Georgia Tech and Boston College, Notre Dame will always play home-and-away series with those two schools each year, and then play the remaining 11 ACC teams on a rotating basis as part of an 18-game conference schedule. The Irish were also scheduled for their first-ever game in the ACC-Big Ten Challenge. On May 8 it was confirmed their opponent in the 2013 Challenge would be Iowa. The full 2013-14 schedule was unveiled August 22. In the poll taken at ACC Media Days in October, the Irish were picked to finish fifth in their first season in the new conference.

Notre Dame recruited four players from the high school senior class of 2012–13, each of whom signed letters-of-intent in November 2012. The recruiting class, which featured three players from the state of Indiana, was ranked among the top 20 in the nation by Rivals.com, Scout.com, and ESPN.

During preseason practices, the Irish suffered two notable injuries in their sophomore class. First, forward Zach Auguste suffered a broken wrist on October 10. Initially expected to be out for up to six weeks, he was ready by the time of the season opener on November 8. On October 26, the school confirmed sophomore Eric Katenda underwent knee surgery that will keep him out for up to six weeks.

When the preseason rankings were released by two major college basketball polls, Notre Dame was #21 in the AP poll and #22 by the USA Today/Coaches Poll.

Roster

The school announced on November 8 that sophomore Cameron Biedschied will sit out the 2013–14 season. Biedschied had no injury issues necessitating the redshirt, but arrived at the decision with Coach Brey that he would benefit academically and athletically by sitting out a year, citing specifically his struggles in conference play during his freshman year. On December 26, however, after the fall semester concluded, Biedscheid requested and received permission to contact other schools in order to transfer.

On December 22, the school announced that Jerian Grant would be suspended for the remainder of the 2013–14 season due to an "academic matter". Grant wrote in a note posted on the school's athletic website that, "It is my full intention to return to Notre Dame as soon as possible following the 2014 spring semester. I intend to do whatever it takes to earn my degree and finish out my college basketball career here."

Schedule and results

|-
!colspan=12 style="background:#002649; color:#CC9933;"| Exhibition

|-
!colspan=12 style="background:#002649; color:#CC9933;"| Regular season

|-
!colspan=12 style="background:#002649; color:#CC9933;"| ACC Regular Season

|-
!colspan=12 style="background:#002649; color:#CC9933;"| ACC Tournament

See also
2013–14 Notre Dame Fighting Irish women's basketball team

References

Notre Dame Fighting Irish men's basketball seasons
Notre Dame
Fight
Fight